KELP may refer to:

 the ICAO code for the El Paso International Airport
 KELP (AM), a radio station (1590 AM) licensed to El Paso, Texas, United States
 KELP-FM, a radio station (89.3 FM) licensed to Mesquite, New Mexico, United States

See also
 Kelp (disambiguation)